Yamal is a Russian  nuclear-powered icebreaker operated by Atomflot (formerly by the Murmansk Shipping Company). She is named after the Yamal Peninsula in Northwest Siberia; the name means End of the Land in Nenets.

Laid down in Leningrad in 1986, and commissioned in October 1992, after the breakup of the Soviet Union, she filled her designed role of keeping shipping lanes open and also carried passengers on Arctic excursions. In July 1994 Yamal took an excursion to the North Pole, with the NSF (National Science Foundation – US), to celebrate the official maiden voyage. In 2007 Lewis Gordon Pugh swam a kilometer at the North Pole, having sailed there aboard Yamal.

Yamal is equipped with a double hull. There is water ballast between the inner and outer hulls which can be shifted in order to aid icebreaking. Yamal can break ice while making way either forwards or backwards.

Yamal is one of the Russian  family of icebreakers, the most powerful icebreakers in the world.  These ships must cruise in cold water to cool their reactors, so they cannot pass through the tropics to undertake voyages in the Southern hemisphere.

Yamal carries one helicopter and several Zodiac boats. Radio and satellite communications systems are installed which can provide navigation, telephone, fax, and email services. Amenities include a large dining room (capable of holding all 100 passengers in one sitting), a library, passenger lounge, auditorium, volleyball court, gymnasium, heated indoor swimming pool, a sauna, and an infirmary. She is equipped with 50 passenger cabins and suites, all with toilets, exterior windows, a television, and a desk.

Yamal also played a significant role in creation of annual travel expeditions to the North Pole, being one of the few vessels capable of getting there and bringing tourists with it in safety. Since 1993 the icebreaker was operated by Murmansk Shipping Company and in 2001–2008 the operation was made by Murmansk Shipping Company and Poseidon Expeditions. Yamal has made a total of 47 voyages to the North Pole.

Events
North Pole-36 and North Pole-37

From August to September 2009 the icebreaker took part in the scheduled evacuation of drifting ice stations. Each station houses 18 polar explorers, dogs, and more than 150 tons of cargo. The evacuation of station personnel and cargo from a drifting ice floe requires three days of continuous, round-the-clock work. This high-latitude Arctic work was supervised by expedition leader Vladimir Sokolov.

Incidents and accidents
On 23 December 1996, a crew member was killed when a fire broke out on board the icebreaker. The nuclear reactor powering the ship was not affected by the fire. The crew extinguished the blaze within 30 minutes.
On 16 March 2009 Yamal collided with the product tanker  in Yenisei Gulf in the Kara Sea. While the tanker suffered a  crack on the main deck, no damage was reported for Yamal.

References

External links

Field reports from tourists made aboard Yamal
Icehunters: Russian conquerors of the North Pole

Nuclear-powered icebreakers
Icebreakers of Russia
1992 ships
Expedition cruising
Ships built at the Baltic Shipyard